I Hate Music is the tenth studio album by American indie rock band Superchunk, released on August 20, 2013, on Merge Records.

Critical reception

I Hate Music garnered generally positive reception from music critics. At Rolling Stone, Will Hermes noted how "The title is bullshit – the kind people spit when dodging pain." Hermes described the album as "rock vets fighting demons with delicious noise and sugar-crusted hooks as darkness falls." At Alternative Press, Jeff Rosenstock alluded to how the album "veers into darker territory than usual", writing that "there is something to be said about a band who have put out 10 records and none of them are bad." In addition, Rosenstock felt that the release contains "anthems with a seemingly endless supply of catchy melodies and air-guitar worthy riffs."

Track listing

References

Superchunk albums
2013 albums
Merge Records albums